Liga Desportiva de Maputo is a Mozambican association football club based in Maputo, Mozambique that plays in the country's top football division, Moçambola. One of the richest clubs in Mozambique, it was founded on 8 November 1990 and has won four league titles and one cup.

History
The club was founded on 8 November 1990 in Maputo under the name of Liga Desportiva Muçulmana de Maputo (Muslim Sporting League of Maputo). On 19 July 2014, the club was renamed to Liga Desportiva de Maputo, in order to separate itself from religion and politics; the naming controversy began in 2012 when FIBA refused to allow the club's women's basketball team from entering the African Champions League.

Achievements
Championship of Mozambique: 2010, 2011, 2013, 2014
Cup of Mozambique: 2012

Performance in CAF competitions
CAF Champions League: 3 appearances
2011 – Preliminary Round
2012 – First Round
2014 – First Round

CAF Confederation Cup: 1 appearance
2013 – Play-off Round

See also
Islam in Mozambique

References

External sources
2014 CAF Champions League – Liga Desportiva Muçulmana de Maputo – cafonline.com
2015 CAF Champions League – Liga Desportiva Muçulmana de Maputo – cafonline.com
Team profile – soccerway.com

 
Football clubs in Mozambique
Association football clubs established in 1990
Maputo
1990 establishments in Mozambique
Islam in Mozambique